Ambo is a Tivoid language of Nigeria.

References

Languages of Nigeria
Tivoid languages
Endangered languages of Africa